Orocrambus is a genus of moths of the family Crambidae. All species are endemic to New Zealand.

Species
Orocrambus abditus Philpott, 1924
Orocrambus aethonellus Meyrick, 1883
Orocrambus angustipennis Zeller, 1877
Orocrambus apicellus Zeller, 1863
Orocrambus callirrhous Meyrick, 1883
Orocrambus catacaustus Meyrick, 1885
Orocrambus clarkei Philpott, 1930
Orocrambus clarkei clarkei Philpott, 1930
Orocrambus clarkei eximia Salmon, 1946
Orocrambus corruptus Butler, 1877
Orocrambus crenaeus Meyrick, 1885
Orocrambus cultus Philpott, 1917
Orocrambus cyclopicus Meyrick, 1883
Orocrambus dicrenellus Meyrick, 1883
Orocrambus enchophorus Meyrick, 1885
Orocrambus ephorus Meyrick, 1885
Orocrambus flexuosellus Doubleday in White & Doubleday, 1843
Orocrambus fugitivellus Hudson, 1950
Orocrambus geminus Patrick, 1991
Orocrambus haplotomus Meyrick, 1883
Orocrambus harpophorus Meyrick, 1883
Orocrambus heliotes Meyrick, 1888
Orocrambus heteraulus Meyrick, 1905
Orocrambus horistes Meyrick, 1902
Orocrambus isochytus Meyrick, 1888
Orocrambus jansoni Gaskin, 1975
Orocrambus lectus Philpott, 1929
Orocrambus lewisi Gaskin, 1975
Orocrambus lindsayi Gaskin, 1975
Orocrambus machaeristes Meyrick, 1905
Orocrambus melampetrus Purdie, 1884
Orocrambus melitastes Meyrick, 1909
Orocrambus mylites Meyrick, 1888
Orocrambus oppositus Philpott, 1915
Orocrambus ordishi Gaskin, 1975
Orocrambus ornatus Philpott, 1927
Orocrambus paraxenus Meyrick, 1885
Orocrambus philpotti Gaskin, 1975
Orocrambus punctellus Hudson, 1950
Orocrambus ramosellus Doubleday in White & Doubleday, 1843
Orocrambus scoparioides Philpott, 1914
Orocrambus scutatus Philpott, 1917
Orocrambus simplex Butler, 1877
Orocrambus siriellus Meyrick, 1883
Orocrambus sophronellus Meyrick, 1885
Orocrambus thymiastes Meyrick, 1901
Orocrambus tritonellus Meyrick, 1885
Orocrambus tuhualis C. Felder, R. Felder & Rogenhofer, 1875
Orocrambus ventosus Meyrick, 1920
Orocrambus vittellus Doubleday in White & Doubleday, 1843
Orocrambus vulgaris Butler, 1877
Orocrambus xanthogrammus Meyrick, 1883

References

Crambinae
Crambidae genera
Endemic fauna of New Zealand
Endemic moths of New Zealand